The 1992 Women's World Weightlifting Championships were held in Varna, Bulgaria from May 16 to May 24, 1992. There were 110 women in action from 25 nations.

Medal summary

Medal table
Ranking by Big (Total result) medals 

Ranking by all medals: Big (Total result) and Small (Snatch and Clean & Jerk)

See also
 Weightlifting at the 1992 Summer Olympics

References
Results (Sport 123)
Weightlifting World Championships Seniors Statistics 

World Weightlifting Championships
World Weightlifting Championships
World Weightlifting Championships
International weightlifting competitions hosted by Bulgaria